Steuben County is the name of two counties in the United States of America:

Steuben County, Indiana
Steuben County, New York